Traprock or trap rock may refer to:

 Trap rock, form of igneous rock exhibiting polygonal vertical fractures
 Traprock Important Bird Area, Queensland, Australia
 Trap Rock River, Michigan, USA
 Walter E. Traprock, pseudonym of American architect and author George Shepard Chappell

See also
 Petroleum trap
 Trap music and Rock music